Pietro Testa (1611–1650) was an Italian High Baroque artist active in Rome. He is best known as a printmaker and draftsman.

Biography
He was born in Lucca, and thus is sometimes called il Lucchesino. He moved to Rome early in life. One source states he was ejected from the Cortona studio in 1631, soon after joining the workshop. Others state Testa trained under Pietro Paolini or under Domenichino, for whom he worked under the patronage of Cassiano dal Pozzo. He was friends with Nicolas Poussin and Francesco Mola.

Some of his etchings, which often include work in drypoint, have a fantastic quality reminiscent of Jacques Callot, or embellishments of his Genoese contemporary Giovanni Benedetto Castiglione and even presciently suggest William Blake. His Sacrifice of Iphigenia appears to have influenced Tiepolo's rendition at Villa Valmarana Ai Nani in Vicenza.  His early prints, from the 1630s, were often religious and were influenced by Federico Barocci.  These achieve very delicate effects of light; his later ones became harder and more austere in style, as he attempted a personal version of neo-classicism, under the influence of the Carracci.  Many of his later subjects were original classical subjects, the most ambitious reflecting his personal struggles.  His prints were successful and frequently copied.

Between 1638 and 1644, Testa completed what is perhaps his most important work, a set of complex and highly detailed etchings on the theme of The Seasons, which served as an expression of his interest in Platonic philosophy. Sympathetic contemporaries considered these his "finest and most important works."

Testa was influenced by Leonardo da Vinci to favor direct observation of natural phenomena, a fact that may have limited his productivity as an artist and might even have caused his death. Accounts of Testa's death are confused and contradictory, some suggesting murder or suicide. Testa was described as melancholic in temperament; his difficult personality caused problematic dealings with his patrons such as Niccolò Simonelli, and a series of projects had ended in frustration. Yet his earliest biographer, the 17th-century author Filippo Baldinucci, indicates that the death was accidental. Commenting on Testa's habit of "depicting night scenes and changes in the atmosphere and in the sky," Baldinucci states that Testa was standing on a Tiber riverbank, "drawing and observing some reflections of the rainbow in the water," when he fell in and drowned.

Some works
Garden of Venus & Sacrifice of Iphigenia 
Sacrifice of Isaac 
Alcibiades Interrupts Socrates' Symposium 
Return of the Prodigal Son 
Nymphs and Satyrs in a Landscape

Notes

Sources
 Cropper, Elizabeth. The Ideal of Painting: Pietro Testa's Düsseldorf Notebook. Princeton, NJ, Princeton University Press, 1984.
 Cropper, Elizabeth, ed. Pietro Testa, 1612-1650: Prints and Drawings. Philadelphia, Philadelphia Museum of Art, 1988.
Freedberg, Sydney J. Painting in Italy: 1500 to 1600 (The Pelican History of Art). New York, Penguin, 1979.
Gage, John. Color and Culture: Practice and Meaning From Antiquity to Abstraction. Boston, Little, Brown & Co., 1993.
 Kammen, Michael G. Time to Every Purpose: The Four Seasons in American Culture. Chapel Hill, NC, University of North Carolina Press, 2004.
 Wittkower, Rudolf. Art and Architecture in Italy: 1600 to 1750 (The Pelican History of Art). New York, Viking, 1973.

External links

good selection of etchings (and copies etc) from San Francisco
Two etchings from the MMA
Two etchings at the Art Museum of Estonia

1650 deaths
17th-century Italian painters
Italian male painters
Italian printmakers
Italian Baroque painters
1611 births